The 2014 East–West Shrine Game, the 89th staging of the all-star college football exhibition game, was held on January 18, 2014, at 4:00 PM EST, and featured NCAA Division I Football Bowl Subdivision players and a few select invitees from Canadian university football. The game featured more than 100 players from the 2013 college football season, and prospects for the 2014 Draft of the professional National Football League (NFL). In the week prior to the game, scouts from all 32 NFL teams attended. The game was held in St. Petersburg, Florida, at Tropicana Field, and benefits Shriners Hospitals for Children.

Players

East Team

Offense

Defense

Specialists

West Team

Offense

Defense

Specialists

Game summary

Scoring summary

Statistics

2014 NFL Draft

References

East-West Shrine Game
East–West Shrine Bowl
American football in Florida
Sports competitions in St. Petersburg, Florida
East-West Shrine Game
East-West Shrine Game